Gypsum Township may refer to:

Gypsum Township, Saline County, Kansas
Gypsum Township, Sedgwick County, Kansas